Mario George Tonelli (March 27, 1916 – January 7, 2003) was a professional American football player who played running back for one season for the Chicago Cardinals

A staff sergeant in the US Army 200th Coast Artillery who survived the Bataan Death March, during the Death March his Notre Dame class ring was stolen by a Japanese guard.  Miraculously it was returned by an English speaking Japanese Officer who had been educated at the University of Southern California and had seen Tonelli score the winning touchdown in the 1937 game between the two schools.  Tonelli later buried the ring in a metal soap dish beneath his prison barracks to confound would be thieves.  Later he was transferred to Davao Penal Colony "Dapecol."  Of the 2,009 estimated total number of POWs that were in Dapecol during its existence from October 1942- June 1944 only 805 would survive the war. He had the nickname "Motts" while in the Army and as a Prisoner of war.

References

External links
 
 

1916 births
2003 deaths
American football running backs
Chicago Cardinals players
Notre Dame Fighting Irish football players
United States Army personnel of World War II
American prisoners of war in World War II
Bataan Death March prisoners
United States Army soldiers
People from Lemont, Illinois
American people of Italian descent